was a Japanese mathematician and computer scientist who specialized in graph algorithms and graph drawing.

Education and career
Nishizeki was born in 1947 in Fukushima, and was a student at Tohoku University, earning a bachelor's degree in 1969, a master's in 1971, and a doctorate in 1974. He continued at Tohoku as a faculty member, and became a full professor there in 1988. He was the Dean of the Graduate School of Information Sciences, Tohoku University, from April 2008 to March 2010. He retired in 2010, becoming a professor emeritus at Tohoku University, but continued teaching as a professor at Kwansei Gakuin University until March 2015. He was an Auditor of Japan Advanced Institute of Science and Technology from April 2016 to October 2018.

Contributions
Nishizeki made significant contributions to algorithms for series–parallel graphs, finding cliques in sparse graphs, planarity testing and the secret sharing with any access structure. He is the co-author of two books on planar graphs and graph drawing.

In 1990, Nishizeki founded the annual International Symposium on Algorithms and Computation (ISAAC).

Awards and honors
At the 18th ISAAC symposium, in 2007, a workshop was held to celebrate his 60th birthday.

In 1996, he became a life fellow of the IEEE "for contributions to graph algorithms with applications to physical design of electronic systems."
In 1996 he was selected as a fellow of the Association for Computing Machinery "for contributions to the design and analysis of efficient algorithms for planar graphs, network flows and VLSI routing".
Nishizeki was also a foreign fellow of the Bangladesh Academy of Sciences; one of his students and frequent co-authors, Md. Saidur Rahman, is from Bangladesh.

Selected publications
Books
.
.

Research articles
.
.
.
.

References

External links

1947 births
2022 deaths
Japanese computer scientists
20th-century Japanese mathematicians
21st-century Japanese mathematicians
Graph drawing people
Fellows of the Association for Computing Machinery
Fellow Members of the IEEE
Fellows of Bangladesh Academy of Sciences
Tohoku University alumni
Academic staff of Tohoku University
Academic staff of Kwansei Gakuin University
People from Fukushima, Fukushima